Vivian Brownlee (born c. 1947) is an American professional golfer who played on the LPGA Tour.

Brownlee won once on the LPGA Tour in 1977.

Professional wins (1)

LPGA Tour wins (1)

References

American female golfers
LPGA Tour golfers
Pennsylvania State University alumni
1940s births
Living people
21st-century American women